Stripped is the title of a stand-up comedy tour by Eddie Izzard, and is a continuation of her style of comedy, full of "stream-of-conscious banter and predilection for nonsensical detours and frequent tangents." The tour was performed from 28 April to 9 August 2008 with three "warm-up" dates. It has been called "not only hilarious but quite remarkable." As for the name of the tour, Izzard says she called it Stripped because"The heels got too high on the last two tours. Now I've just gone back to blokey mode, so I've got all this movement back which I couldn't do before. The set is leaner, what I'm wearing is leaner and just focusing on what I'm talking about. I keep talking about God and I come to all these different conclusions. I'm talking about the whole civilization, trying to strip that back, as well. The last 5,000 years we did everything. I put out my idea what we're doing here. I think it's all random. If there is a God, his plan is very similar to someone not having a plan."

Stripped ran for 23 nights at the Lyric Theatre from November to 23 December 2008. The 22 and 23 December dates were recorded for DVD release. From October to December 2009, Izzard took Stripped on tour around the UK—her first UK tour in six years.

In 2010, Izzard performed a limited one-night-only run of Stripped Too in seven American cities. In April and May 2010, Izzard performed Stripped for 13 shows in various Canadian cities as part of her Canadian tour. Izzard performed Stripped Tout en Français in Paris from 15 April to 11 June 2011.

The show also came to Australasia towards the end of 2011, performing several shows across Australia and New Zealand in November and December of that year.

Tour dates

References

Eddie Izzard
Comedy tours
Eddie Izzard albums
Spoken word albums by English artists
Events at Malmö Arena